Vic Ekberg (16 June 1932 – 27 July 2020) was an Australian ice hockey player. He competed in the men's tournament at the 1960 Winter Olympics.

References

1932 births
2020 deaths
Australian ice hockey players
Olympic ice hockey players of Australia
Ice hockey players at the 1960 Winter Olympics
Place of birth missing
Canadian emigrants to Australia